Sapfo Notara (born Sapfo Chandanou (Σαπφώ Χανδάνου), c. 1907 – June 11, 1985) was a Greek actress, known for supporting capabilities in acting. In Greek films, she acted in comedies as an aunt or a housewife. Notara had a radio programme called I Kiria Kiriaki. One of her last theatre appearances was in the play Pornography (1981).

Selected filmography
H Lykaina (The wolf, 1951)
Kyriakatiko Ksypnima (Sunday awakening, 1954)
H Kyra mas i mami (The lady our midwife, 1958)
H Kyria Dimarchos (The lady mayor, 1960)
I Hartopaihtra (The gambler, 1964)
Dimitri mou, Dimitri mou (My Dimitri, My Dimitri, 1967)
Ah afti i gynaika mou (Ah, this wife of mine, 1967)
Na'tane to 13 na pefte se mas (1970)
O Kyrios Pterarhos (Mr. Chief Master Sergeant)
Pornography (1981, play)

External links

1900s births
1985 deaths
Greek women comedians
Greek film actresses
Greek radio actresses
Greek stage actresses
Actresses from Crete
Actresses from Athens
20th-century Greek actresses
20th-century comedians
People from Heraklion